Anna Mohr (10 July 1944 – 4 May 2020) was a Swedish archaeologist and LGBT+ activist. In January 1995, she and her partner Britt Dahlgren were the first lesbian couple to enter in a civil union in Sweden. In May 2020, she died from COVID-19 during the COVID-19 pandemic in Sweden.

She was formerly the chair of EKHO, and worked with RFSL's Health & HIV group for 20 years. She was one of the activists behind Frigörelsedagen ('liberation day') in Stockholm in the 1970s. The movement eventually grew into Stockholm Pride.

References 

1944 births
2020 deaths
Swedish lesbians
Swedish LGBT rights activists
LGBT anthropologists
People from Stockholm
Swedish women activists
Swedish archaeologists
Deaths from the COVID-19 pandemic in Sweden
21st-century Swedish LGBT people